The New Athos Cave also Novoafonskaya, Novy Afon Cave, or New Afon Cave is a karst cave in the Iverian Mountain in Abkhazia (Georgia) near the city of New Athos.

Overview
The abyss on a slope of the Iverian Mountain was known for ages, referred to as the "Bottomless Pit". It was explored in 1961 by an expedition of four: Zurab Tatashidze, Arsen Okrojanashvili, Boris Gergedava, and Givi Smyr.

Since 1975, it has been a major tourist attraction, featuring its own underground railway. The cave consists of 9 major cavities.

Gallery

See also
New Athos Cave Railway
Voronya Cave, second deepest in the world

Notes and references

External links

 New Athos Cave home page
New Athos Cave at showcaves.com

Caves of Abkhazia
Limestone caves
Show caves
Geography of Abkhazia
Gudauta District
Tourist attractions in Georgia (country)